John Bradford (9 April 1895 – 1969) was an English footballer who played in the Football League for Grimsby Town, Wolverhampton Wanderers and Bournemouth & Boscombe Athletic.

Career
Bradford made over 100 appearances for Grimsby Town between 1920–1924 in Division Three (North), before joining Wolverhampton Wanderers in 1924.

He made his Wolves debut on 29 March 1924 in a 3–0 win over Barrow, one of two appearances during this season which ended with promotion back to the Second Division at the first attempt.

He made 40 appearances for the Midlanders during the 1924-25 season but only appeared occasionally in the following two campaigns before moving to Bournemouth & Boscombe Athletic in 1927.

He died in 1969.

References

 

1895 births
1969 deaths
English footballers
English Football League players
Grimsby Town F.C. players
Wolverhampton Wanderers F.C. players
AFC Bournemouth players
People from Pilsley, North East Derbyshire
Association football defenders
Footballers from Derbyshire